Gustaf Cronhielm (18 July 1664, Stockholm – 3 June 1737) was a Swedish nobleman and politician. He was Governor of Västmanland County 1698–1710.

1664 births
1737 deaths
Swedish nobility
County governors of Sweden
18th-century Swedish politicians